A "Head-Neck-Body farmhouse" or Head-Neck-Rump farmhouse is a typical Frisian farmhouse. It consists  of a residence (the head) and a kitchen (the neck) placed in line in front of a big shed (the body).  A striking fact is that the residence was never built in the centre front of the shed – this has to do with the origin of this type of farmhouse from a smaller type of farmhouse that has now disappeared. This original Old Frisian longhouse consisted of a residence with a cattle shed immediately behind it. The harvest was stacked in the attic or in open barns which were logically located near the livestock shed.

Due to the development of better harvesting materials at the beginning of the 16th century there was a need for more storage space for the harvest. This was solved by building a bigger shed behind the 'head and neck' of the original farmhouse. 

These farmhouses can be found in Friesland, Groningen and (in the northern part of) North Holland. Although sometimes considered as typically Frisian, the origin of this kind of farmhouse is found in the Het Bildt county where for the first time intensive agriculture flourished; the Bildt was especially suitable for harvesting large areas of land. Because harvest quantities became larger, the inhabitants, who were mostly of South Holland origin, were some of the first who needed more storage and ordinary open barns gradually developed into large, enclosed sheds. 
Although there is a distinct difference between the typical Frisian farmhouses in northern provinces and the Bildts farmhouses, only the Bildts farmhouses have the feature whereby the sheds are placed at right-angles to the residential part of the house. These days both types can be found in the Bildt.

References

External links
A German language book from 1885 on the Frisian Farmhouse, heavily illustrated.

Farmhouses
Vernacular architecture
Agricultural buildings in the Netherlands